The  is a bridge located in Kawazu, Shizuoka on Japan National Route 414 connecting Numazu to Shimoda, in Japan's Izu Peninsula southwest of Tokyo.

Description

From the direction of Shimoda/Kawazu Station, it goes uphill counterclockwise, and from the direction of Izu/Amagi Tunnel, it goes downhill clockwise and loops 720 degrees twice. In addition to cars and motorcycles, bicycles can also pass through.

History
In the past, National Route 414 used hairpin turns along the mountain, but it collapsed due to the 1978 Izu Ōshima earthquake and the road on the hillside was cut off. After that, the convenience of passage and the height difference were eliminated, and a construction method was adopted stemming from the lessons learned from landslides caused by the earthquake. In 1981, the Kawazu-Nanadaru Loop Bridge was opened. In the same year, it won the Tanaka Award from the Japan Society of Civil Engineers.

Notes

References

External links

1981 establishments in Japan
Bridges completed in 1981
Road bridges in Japan
Buildings and structures in Shizuoka Prefecture
Kawazu, Shizuoka
Spiral bridges